Charles Robinson (18 February 1879 – 23 September 1951) was an Australian cricketer. He played four first-class matches for Tasmania between 1912 and 1914 and one match for Western Australia in 1920/21.

See also
 List of Tasmanian representative cricketers
 List of Western Australia first-class cricketers

References

External links
 

1879 births
1951 deaths
Australian cricketers
Tasmania cricketers
Western Australia cricketers
People from Dubbo
Cricketers from New South Wales